Robert Moon Anderson (December 10, 1824 – September 17, 1878) was the fourth Lieutenant Governor of California from 1856 to 1858.

Biography
Anderson was born in Albemarle County, Virginia on December 10, 1824, the son of Nathaniel Anderson and Mildred Cobb Moon.

Little is known of his life, but it appears that he was raised in Memphis, Tennessee, and served in the Mexican–American War before settling in El Dorado, California. He joined the short-lived Know Nothing Party (also called the Native American Party and American Party). He was the party's successful nominee for lieutenant governor in 1856 and served one term, 1856 to 1858.

Family
In 1849 he was married to Lucy Wyatt in Tennessee, and they were the parents of three children: Frances Hall Anderson, the wife of Crabtree Belcher, and after his death the wife of Jack Trent Anderson; Lucy Jhule Anderson, the wife of Harry Reading (d. October 24, 1932); and Nathaniel Moon Anderson (d. 1927).

References

Lieutenant Governors of California
California Know Nothings
19th-century American politicians
1824 births
1878 deaths